In telecommunications, a call collision (commonly known as glare) is one of two things:
The contention that occurs when a terminal and data circuit-terminating equipment (DCE) specify the same communication channel at the same time to transfer a call request and handle an incoming call. When call collision occurs, the DCE proceeds with the call request and cancels the incoming call.
The condition that occurs when a trunk or channel is seized at both ends simultaneously.

Glare can sometimes be experienced as trying to make a call out on a PBX, and instead being connected to an incoming call. This can happen at home too, if a call out is made at the exact second that a call is about to start ringing in.

Multi-line hunting attempts to avoid glare by selecting circuits in opposite preference order so the highest numbered line, which is last choice for incoming calls, is first choice for outgoing calls, like so:

incoming -->1
            2
            3
            4
            5
            6
            7
            8<-- outgoing

With PRI circuits, the channel selection sequence is specified when the circuit is provisioned. Common practice is to have the PBX use descending channel selection, and the carrier to use ascending. Glare is not common on PRI circuits because the signaling is so fast, however it is not impossible (especially if there are subtle differences in the timers at either end, and the circuit is being used at near-capacity). The users will not experience a connection to an unexpected call (as would be the case with analog circuits), because glare causes protocol errors that generally prevent any sort of successful connection. Instead, one or both of the call attempts might fail, and ideally an error would appear in the logs (this depends on the logging capabilities of the systems at either end of the circuit). Glare is quite rare on PRI circuits, and can be difficult to troubleshoot.

For old, analog PBX trunks, glare can be reduced by using ground start signaling, which offers better answer and disconnect supervision. IE: Nortel BSP discouraged using loop start trunks for this and other reasons.  Long Distance exchanges in the 1950s and 60s incorporated Glare Detectors to alleviate the problem.

References

Teletraffic